The Medal for Noble Deeds (GM/SMbg) is a Swedish medal intended to honour personal courage in a civilian context. It is used to honour not only the noble deed of lifesaving but also courage and presence of mind. Since its inception in 1832, the medal has been awarded in gold in two sizes and in silver in one size.

History
Gustav III approved the medal Illis quorum meruere labores, in 1785, but there is no information to indicate that it was awarded until 1787. After Gustav III's death, no awards were given. Gustav IV Adolf took the medal into use in 1798 and it was used relatively extensively during the 19th century. The medal was used for various contributions and for people from large parts of society. Sui memores alios fecere merendo ("To those who affirm their memory in others by doing good deeds") was established in 1805 by Gustaf IV Adolf intended to honor efforts for public benefit activities. It then became a reward for saving human lives.

In 1832, Charles XIV John decided that the medals would be used in Swedish language in the future, but that the variants in Latin would be retained for special cases. This meant that a certain confusion took place between the medals for a number of years. In the 1860s, Illis quorum regained its status as an award for Swedish citizens for civic merit. Illis quorums equivalent in Swedish language, the Medal for Noble Deeds (För medborgerlig förtjänst), therefore became in 1832 an award for long-lasting and solid locally emphasized efforts in the municipal and of a practical nature. Illis quourum was awarded to a large extent for e.g. cultural merits. The Medal for Noble Deeds, which is the Swedish version of Sui memores alios fecere merendo, was also instituted in 1832 to be awarded to Swedes, while the version in Latin is awarded to foreigners.

Appearance

Sizes
Gold medal of the 8th size (GMbg8), gold medal of the 5th size (GMbg5) and silver medal of the 8th size (SMbg8).

Ribbon
The ribbon is royal blue with a yellow stripe toward each edge.

Presenting
The medal is rarely awarded, on average less than once a year. Between 1975 and 2005, the medal was awarded only 17 times, and only in gold of the fifth size.

Selected recipients

References

Notes

Print

Orders, decorations, and medals of Sweden
Awards established in 1832
1832 establishments in Sweden